Henry Nzioka Mulli (1927 – July 5, 2015) was a Kenyan diplomat.

Career 
From 1951 to 1953 he was Assistant Government Chemist in Tanganyika.
From 1953 to 1957 he was detained by the regime of the Kenya Colony.
In 1960 he became Master of Science at the Machakos High School.
In 1961 he was elected Member for Machakos to the Legislative Council.
In 1962 he was with Justus Kandet ole Tipis (1924-1995) Parliamentary Secretary in the Ministry of Kenya Defence.
In the elections in May 1963 he ran directly against Paul Ngei and lost.
From 1964 to 1965 he was ambassador in Beijing in the People's Republic of China.
From 1965 to 1966 he was ambassador in Cairo.
Form 1968 to 1969 he was ambassador in Mogadishu (Somalia)
From 1970 to 1973 he was ambassador in Bonn (Germany)
In 1974 - 1976 he was ambassador in Paris (France)].
In 1992 - 1993 he was  Chairman of the Cooperative Bank of Kenya.

References

1927 births
2015 deaths
People from Machakos County
Ambassadors of Kenya to China
Ambassadors of Kenya to Egypt
Ambassadors of Kenya to Somalia
Ambassadors of Kenya to France
Ambassadors of Kenya to Serbia